Charlie Henry Dawson (born 7 April 1883) was an English footballer who played in the Football League for Preston North End.

References

1883 births
20th-century deaths
Year of death unknown
English footballers
Association football forwards
English Football League players
Ashton Town A.F.C. players
Preston North End F.C. players